Granada 74 Club de Fútbol, S.A.D., commonly known as Granada 74, was a Spanish football team based in Granada, in the autonomous community of Andalusia. It has not registered in any competition since 2009, it held home matches at Estadio La Victoria de Pinos Puente, with a capacity of 4,400 spectators.

History
Granada 74 CF was created on 6 June 2007 when Carlos Marsá, an investor from Granada, bought Segunda División team Ciudad de Murcia. Ciudad's footballing rights and contracts were transferred to the newly founded side, which in practice meant Ciudad had been relocated to Granada even if the club was considered a new entity.

Ciudad players still under contract for the 2007–08 season had the option to stay with the new club or cancel their contract. Also, as part of the new setup, Tercera División's CP Granada 74 became the reserve team.

For the 2009–10 campaign, Granada 74 was not registered in any category.

Seasons

1 season in Segunda División
1 season in Segunda División B

See also
CP Granada 74 (reserve team)
Relocation of professional sports teams

References

External links
Official website 

 
Football clubs in Andalusia
Sport in Granada
Association football clubs established in 2007
Association football clubs disestablished in 2009
2007 establishments in Spain
2009 disestablishments in Spain
Segunda División clubs